The Okorokov effect or resonant coherent excitation, occurs when heavy ions move in crystals under channeling conditions. V. Okorokov predicted this effect in 1965 and it was first observed by Sheldon Datz in 1978.

References

Charge carriers
Ions
Physical chemistry